John Leslie Coombes is a serial killer in Victoria, Australia. He killed twice in 1984 and again in 2009, and is now serving a life sentence with no chance of parole.

Murder of Henry Desmond Kells, 1984

In 1984 he stabbed and killed Henry Desmond Kells, aged 44, at his home in Chelsea. In December 1985 Coombes was sentenced to life imprisonment, but this was later reduced to a minimum sentence of 11 years.

Murder of Michael Peter Speirani, 1984

Seven weeks after his release in  1996 he was remanded for the 1984 murder of Michael Speirani who had gone missing on a fishing trip. His stabbed and mutilated body had been dumped a few kilometres off the coast of Port Phillip Bay. In 1998 Coombes received a 10-year minimum sentence. He was paroled in 2007.

Murder of Raechel Betts, 2009
Coombes strangled Raechel Betts, 27, a childcare worker in August 2009 at the home of co-defendant Nicole Godfrey on Phillip Island. He cut her body up in a bathtub, and threw the body parts off a pier at Newhaven. Coombes changed his plea to guilty during pre-trial arguments at the Supreme Court and was jailed for life with no chance of parole. Justice Geoffrey Nettle noted the similarity between his three murders, saying "It evinces a frightening predilection for homicide" and that he believed that given the chance he would kill again.

See also 
 List of serial killers by country

References 

Australian serial killers
1954 births
Living people
Male serial killers